Armona Union Elementary School District is a school district serving Armona, California, and outlying rural areas as well as a portion of southwest Hanford. Armona is a census-designated place with 3,239 people in the 2000 Census, with approximately 35.4% of the population under the age of 18.

Structure
The district is led by Superintendent Dr. Xavier Piña and the elected School Board. The district operates four schools: Armona Elementary, Parkview Middle School, Crossroads Charter Academy, and Crossroads Trade Tech Academy.

Schools

Armona Elementary
Armona Elementary School was founded in 1952 and serves the district's students from Kindergarten to Fourth Grade. It is currently headed by Principal Veronica Pelayo-Morales. The school has a faculty of approximately 30 full and part-time teachers.

Parkview Middle School
Parkview Middle School serves the district's students from Fifth Grade to Eighth Grade. It is currently headed by Principal Kathi Felder. The school has a faculty of approximately 20 full and part-time teachers. After eighth grade, students in the district attend Sierra Pacific High School or Hanford West High School for 9th through 12th Grade.

Crossroads Charter Academy
Crossroads Charter Academy was founded in 2003 and is currently headed by Principal Laurie Blue. It has a staff of two full-time teachers and 28 part-time teachers. The school is a Virtual Independent Study program serving Kindergarten through Twelfth Grade. Crossroads Trade Tech Academy is a hybrid school which means students attend daily for three hours a day and then do independent study to complete work not finished during the school day. Trade Tech has a focus on career education and currently has an emphasis on construction. As of May 2011, there are 75 students attending Trade Tech.

References

External links
 

School districts in Kings County, California
Hanford, California
1952 establishments in California
School districts established in 1952